Heatherden Hall is a Grade II-listed, Victorian country house located in Iver Heath, Buckinghamshire, England. It stands in the grounds of Pinewood Studios and is used as offices, film sets, and as a wedding venue.

It was purchased by Lieutenant-Colonel Walter Grant Morden, a Canadian financier and Member of Parliament, who transformed the mansion by adding a large ballroom and Turkish bath. During the 1930s it became a retreat and private meeting place for politicians and diplomats.

History

When Morden died in 1932, the estate was bought at auction by Charles Boot, who had recently inherited a large construction firm from his father, Henry Boot, who had died in 1931. Within a year Charles Boot had transformed Heatherden Hall into the office building for a new film studio complex that occupied the grounds.

The mansion has two main fronts: one formal three-storey entrance and another that is seen mostly in films. A conservatory was added to the front where the door was once situated, and became known as the Gatsby Suite; however, this was subsequently removed and now forms part of the enlarged outdoor terrace. The grand ballroom runs along the side. Heatherden Hall has extensive grounds with formal gardens and lakes, plants and features. The many trees surrounding the manor served as the inspiration for the name "Pinewood".

Use in films

The house and gardens have been featured in many British films, including Doctor in the House, Twice Round the Daffodils, The Amazing Mr Blunden, Chitty Chitty Bang Bang, Bugsy Malone, The Prime of Miss Jean Brodie, From Russia with Love (as the SPECTRE headquarters) and the Carry On films. It has appeared in such television series as One Foot in the Grave and Midsomer Murders.

References

External links
Heatherden Hall at the Pinewood Group official website

Country houses in Buckinghamshire
Grade II listed houses in Buckinghamshire